Plant's gulella snail, scientific name Gulella plantii, is a species of very small air-breathing land snail, a terrestrial pulmonate gastropod mollusk in the family Streptaxidae. This species is endemic to South Africa.

References

Endemic fauna of South Africa
Gulella
Taxonomy articles created by Polbot